This is a list of the government ministries of Akwa Ibom State, Nigeria. Each ministry is headed by the commissioner, assisted by a Permanent Secretary.

List of ministries and their commissioners

See also 
 Akwa Ibom State

References 

Lists of government ministries